Arnold Kevin Ebiketie (born January 23, 1999) is a Cameroonian-born American football outside linebacker for the Atlanta Falcons of the National Football League (NFL). He played college football at Temple before transferring to Penn State.

High school career
Ebiketie originally attended Richard Montgomery High School in Rockville, Maryland before transferring to Albert Einstein High School in Kensington, Maryland. As a senior he had 21.5 sacks. He committed to Temple University to play college football.

College career
Ebiketie played at Temple from 2017 to 2020. While there he had 58 tackles and six sacks. After the 2020 season he transferred to Penn State University. He became a starter his first year at Penn State.

Professional career

Ebiketie was drafted by the Atlanta Falcons in the second round, 38th overall, 2022 NFL Draft. Ebiketie made his season debut in Week 1 against the New Orleans Saints where he recorded his first professional sack. Ebiketie made his first professional start in Week 6 against the San Francisco 49ers, he made five tackles in the 28–14 win. In Week 10 against the Chicago Bears, Ebiketie recorded a season-high 6 tackles and a sack in the 27–24 win.

Ebiketie finished the season with 30 total tackles, 2.5 sacks, and two forced fumbles.

References

External links
 Atlanta Falcons bio
Temple Owls bio
Penn State Nittany Lions bio

Living people
Players of American football from Maryland
Sportspeople from Montgomery County, Maryland
Sportspeople from Yaoundé
American football defensive ends
Cameroonian players of American football
Temple Owls football players
Penn State Nittany Lions football players
People from Silver Spring, Maryland
Atlanta Falcons players
1999 births